Benjamin McDowell is an American football coach and former player who was most recently the head coach of the Washington Valor of the Arena Football League (AFL).

College career
McDowell attended Lenoir–Rhyne, where he was a First Team All-South Atlantic Conference player in 2005-06.

Coaching career
When the Washington Valor fired Dean Cokinos on May 16, 2018, after a 0–7 start to the 2018 season, McDowell was named the interim head coach. Under McDowell, the Valor finished the season with a 2–3 record and the last place position for the playoffs of four AFL teams that qualified. The Valor then upset the top-seeded Albany Empire in a home-and-home series with the greater aggregate score. The Valor then defeated the Baltimore Brigade 69–55 in ArenaBowl XXXI. After the season ended, McDowell's interim tag was removed and was named the permanent head coach for the 2019 season.

Head coaching record

AFL

References

External links
ArenaFan stats
Just Sports Stats

Living people
1985 births
Lenoir–Rhyne Bears football players
Georgia Force players
Alabama Hammers players
New Orleans VooDoo players
Washington Valor coaches
American football defensive ends
Tampa Bay Storm coaches